Brian Christopher O'Halloran (born December 20, 1969) is an American actor, producer, and podcaster best known for playing Dante Hicks in Kevin Smith's debut 1994 film Clerks and its 2006 and 2022 sequels Clerks II and Clerks III. He has also made appearances in most of Smith's View Askewniverse films, either as Dante Hicks or one of Dante's cousins.

Early life
O'Halloran was born in Manhattan, New York City, and lived in Old Bridge Township, New Jersey from the age of 13. A second-generation Irish-American, both his parents emigrated from Ireland. His father died when O'Halloran was 15 years old. He graduated from Cedar Ridge High School.

Career
O'Halloran's first role was in Kevin Smith's film Clerks, in 1994. He has returned many times to reprise his role as Dante Hicks in films by Smith.

O'Halloran is the lead actor in the 2000 film Vulgar, about a small town clown who is traumatized after he is attacked during one of his performances. Writer/director Bryan Johnson wrote the lead specifically with O'Halloran in mind.

He has worked on theatre productions since high school. He has said on the subject of doing theatre:

Since Clerks, O'Halloran has primarily been a stage actor, working with the Boomerang Theatre Company, the New Jersey Repertory Company and the Tri-State Actors Theatre, among others.

In 2020, O'Halloran began presenting his own pop culture podcast, The O'HalloRant, on YouTube.

Personal life
He is currently a resident of Pennsylvania.  He has two older brothers.

Filmography

References

External links

 
 Brian O'Halloran at NJTheater.com

1969 births
American male film actors
Living people
American people of Irish descent
Male actors from New Jersey
Old Bridge High School alumni
People from Old Bridge Township, New Jersey
20th-century American male actors
21st-century American male actors
American male stage actors
American podcasters